Heteromeringia is a genus of flies in the family Clusiidae. There are more than 70 described species in Heteromeringia.

Species
These 76 species belong to the genus Heteromeringia:

Heteromeringia abatanensis Sasakawa, 2011
Heteromeringia aethiopica Verbeke, 1968
Heteromeringia annulipes Johnson, 1913
Heteromeringia apholis Lonsdale & Marshall, 2007
Heteromeringia aphotisma Lonsdale & Marshall, 2007
Heteromeringia apicalis Sasakawa, 1966
Heteromeringia atypica Frey, 1960
Heteromeringia australiae Malloch, 1926
Heteromeringia cornuta Sasakawa, 1966
Heteromeringia crenulata Sueyoshi, 2006
Heteromeringia czernyi Kertész, 1903
Heteromeringia decora Lonsdale & Marshall, 2007
Heteromeringia didyma Sasakawa, 1966
Heteromeringia dimidiata Hennig, 1938
Heteromeringia flavifrons Hennig, 1938
Heteromeringia flavipes (Williston, 1896)
Heteromeringia flaviventris Sasakawa, 1966
Heteromeringia fucata Hendel, 1936
Heteromeringia fumipennis Melander & Argo, 1924
Heteromeringia gressitti Sasakawa, 1966
Heteromeringia hardyi McAlpine, 1960
Heteromeringia helicina Sasakawa, 1966
Heteromeringia hypoleuca McAlpine, 1960
Heteromeringia imitans Malloch, 1930
Heteromeringia kondoi Sasakawa, 1966
Heteromeringia lateralis Lonsdale & Marshall, 2007
Heteromeringia laticornis McAlpine, 1960
Heteromeringia leucosticta Frey, 1960
Heteromeringia luzonica Frey, 1928
Heteromeringia lyneborgi Sasakawa, 1966
Heteromeringia malaisei Frey, 1960
Heteromeringia malayensis Sasakawa, 1966
Heteromeringia mediana Lonsdale & Marshall, 2007
Heteromeringia melaena Sasakawa, 1966
Heteromeringia melanoprotoma Sasakawa, 2011
Heteromeringia melasoma Sasakawa, 1966
Heteromeringia mirabilis Sasakawa, 1966
Heteromeringia nanella Lonsdale & Marshall, 2007
Heteromeringia nervosa Lonsdale & Marshall, 2007
Heteromeringia nigricans Sasakawa, 1966
Heteromeringia nigriceps Lamb, 1914
Heteromeringia nigrifrons Kertész, 1903
Heteromeringia nigrimana Loew, 1864
Heteromeringia nigripes Melander & Argo, 1924
Heteromeringia nigrotibialis Frey, 1960
Heteromeringia nitida Johnson, 1913
Heteromeringia nitobei Sasakawa, 1966
Heteromeringia norrisi McAlpine, 1960
Heteromeringia novaguinensis Sasakawa, 1966
Heteromeringia opisthochracea Sasakawa, 1966
Heteromeringia papuensis Sasakawa, 1966
Heteromeringia paraphalloides Sasakawa, 2011
Heteromeringia pectinata Sasakawa, 2011
Heteromeringia polynesiensis Sasakawa, 1966
Heteromeringia pristilepsis Sasakawa, 1966
Heteromeringia pulla McAlpine, 1960
Heteromeringia quadriseta Lonsdale & Marshall, 2007
Heteromeringia quadrispinosa Sueyoshi, 2006
Heteromeringia rufithorax Czerny, 1926
Heteromeringia sexramifera Sueyoshi, 2006
Heteromeringia spinulifera Sasakawa, 2011
Heteromeringia spinulosa McAlpine, 1960
Heteromeringia stenygralis Sasakawa, 1966
Heteromeringia steyskali Sasakawa, 1966
Heteromeringia stictica Sasakawa, 1966
Heteromeringia strandtmannorum Sasakawa, 1966
Heteromeringia supernigra Mamaev, 1987
Heteromeringia sycophanta Sasakawa, 1966
Heteromeringia tephrinos Lonsdale & Marshall, 2007
Heteromeringia trimaculata Sasakawa, 1993
Heteromeringia veitchi Bezzi, 1928
Heteromeringia volcana Lonsdale & Marshall, 2007
Heteromeringia yamata Sueyoshi, 2006
Heteromeringia zophina Lonsdale & Marshall, 2007
Heteromeringia zosteriformis Sasakawa, 1966

References

Further reading

External links

 

Schizophora genera
Articles created by Qbugbot
Taxa named by Leander Czerny
Clusiidae